The Kine Centre is a  modern style skyscraper in the Central Business District of Johannesburg, South Africa. It was built in 1974 to a height of 123 metres. The building has 25 floors of office space, several large stores, a 10 screen  cinema complex that seats 2500 people which is now mothballed, and two levels of underground parking. The building also has a famous penthouse located on the top floor. The Kine Centre is connected to the Carlton Centre via a pedestrian tunnel. The building was sold for Rand 9.1 million (USD $910,000) in February 2003.

References 

Office buildings completed in 1974
1974 establishments in South Africa
Skyscraper office buildings in Johannesburg
20th-century architecture in South Africa